Dangba (Mandarin: 红星乡) is a township in Barkam, Ngawa Tibetan and Qiang Autonomous Prefecture, Sichuan, China. In 2010, Dangba Township had a total population of 2,698: 1,469 males and 1,229 females: 377 aged under 14, 1,960 aged between 15 and 65 and 361 aged over 65.

See also 
 List of township-level divisions of Sichuan

References 

Township-level divisions of Sichuan
Ngawa Tibetan and Qiang Autonomous Prefecture